Syed Javed Ali Shah Jillani is a Pakistani politician who has been a member of the National Assembly of Pakistan since August 2018. Previously, he was a member of the National Assembly from 2003 to 2007.

Early life and education
He was born on 8 May 1948, in Khairpur Mir's, Pakistan.

He received a degree of Bachelor of Arts (Hons) in 1970 and Masters in Political Science in 1971, both from the University of Sindh.

Political career

He ran for the seat of the National Assembly of Pakistan as a candidate of Pakistan Peoples Party (PPP) from Constituency NA-216 (Khairpur-II) in 2002 Pakistani general election but was unsuccessful. He received 58,735 votes and lost the seat to Pir Sadaruddin Shah. In the same election, he ran for the seat of the Provincial Assembly of Sindh as an independent candidate from Constituency PS-29 (Khairpur-I) but was unsuccessful. He received 19 votes and lost the seat to Syed Qaim Ali Shah.

He was elected to the National Assembly as a candidate of Pakistan Muslim League (F) (PML-F) from Constituency NA-216 (Khairpur-II) in by-election held in January 2003. He received 128,783 votes and defeated Ahmed Raza Shah Jilani, a candidate of PPP.

He ran for the seat of the National Assembly as a candidate of PML-F from Constituency NA-215 (Khairpur-I) in 2008 Pakistani general election but was unsuccessful. He received 34,014 votes and lost the seat to Nawab Ali Wassan.

He ran for the seat of the National Assembly as a candidate of PPP from Constituency NA-217 (Khairpur-III) in 2013 Pakistani general election but was unsuccessful. He received 71,916 votes and lost the seat to Syed Kazim Ali.

He was re-elected to the National Assembly from Constituency NA-210 (Khairpur-III) as a candidate of PPP in 2018 Pakistani general election.

References

Living people
Pakistani MNAs 2018–2023
Pakistan People's Party MNAs
1948 births
Pakistani MNAs 2002–2007
University of Sindh alumni